The 1993 Toray Pan Pacific Open was a women's tennis tournament played on indoor carpet courts. It was the 10th edition of the Toray Pan Pacific Open, and was part of the Tier I Series of the 1993 WTA Tour. It took place at the Yokohama Arena in Yokohama, Japan, from February 2 through February 7, 1993.

Finals

Singles

 Martina Navratilova defeated  Larisa Savchenko-Neiland 6–2, 6–2

Doubles

 Lisa Raymond /  Helena Suková  defeated  Lori McNeil /  Rennae Stubbs 6–4, 6–3

References

External links
Official website

Toray Pan Pacific Open
Pan Pacific Open
Toray Pan Pacific Open
Toray Pan Pacific Open
Toray Pan Pacific Open
1993 Toray Pan Pacific Open